Mike Karr is a fictional character on the long-running daytime soap opera, The Edge of Night.

A tireless crime-fighter, Karr was introduced as a cop finishing law school. This character evolved from the earlier Perry Mason character on radio.  He then progressed to the District Attorney's office as an ADA, hung his own shingle as a defense attorney for several years, then became DA of Monticello. Karr was played by three actors: John Larkin (radio's Perry Mason) from the show's debut in April 1956 to October 1961, Laurence Hugo from November 1961 to June 1, 1971, then Forrest Compton from June 2, 1971 until the show ended on December 28, 1984.

Mike Karr was the only character on The Edge of Night to last the entire run of the series. Mike appeared in both the premiere episode April 2, 1956, and the final telecast on December 28, 1984.

Storylines
Mike and Sara Lane (Teal Ames) were dating at the beginning of the series and had enormously chemistry together. Their relationship was filled with tenderness, humor, gentle sparring, and enormous devotion for one another. Mike and Sara married on February 26, 1957, following his recovery from a potentially fatal gunshot wound. They enjoyed nearly five years of happiness together before Sara tragically died on February 22, 1961.

After a respectable period of mourning for his late wife Sara, Mike began dating reporter Nancy Pollock (Ann Flood). They were married on April 22, 1963. The couple enjoyed one of the most stable marriages in soap opera history despite the constant threat of murder and mayhem (much of it introduced due to Mike's involvement with the Crime Commission). Mike and Nancy's relationship was severely tested in the fall of 1976 as Nancy became embroiled in the machinations of criminals Beau Richardson and Tony Saxon. The secrets and conflicts surrounding Beau's secret threats against Timmy Faraday prompted Nancy to separate from Mike and move into an apartment. After Beau's murder, the Karrs reconciled.

Mike was tried and convicted for Beau's murder in the fall of 1977, but after receiving a suspended sentence, Mike was ultimately exonerated.

References 

Fictional lawyers
Fictional American police officers
The Edge of Night characters
Television characters introduced in 1956